Arachidonate 8-lipoxygenase is an enzyme that catalyzes the chemical reaction

arachidonate + O2  (5Z,9E,11Z,14Z)-(8R)-8-hydroperoxyicosa-5,9,11,14-tetraenoate

Thus, the two substrates of this enzyme are arachidonate and oxygen, whereas its product is (5Z,9E,11Z,14Z)-(8R)-8-hydroperoxyicosa-5,9,11,14-tetraenoate.

This enzyme belongs to the family of oxidoreductases, specifically those acting on single donors with O2 as oxidant and incorporation of two atoms of oxygen into the substrate (oxygenases). The oxygen incorporated need not be derived from O2.  The systematic name of this enzyme class is arachidonate:oxygen 8-oxidoreductase. Other names in common use include 8-lipoxygenase, and 8(R)-lipoxygenase.  This enzyme participates in arachidonic acid metabolism.

Structural studies

As of late 2007, only one structure has been solved for this class of enzymes, with the PDB accession code .

References

 

EC 1.13.11
Enzymes of known structure